Stephen Grimes may refer to:

 Stephen B. Grimes (1927–1988), English production designer and art director
 Stephen H. Grimes (1927–2021), American lawyer and jurist